Geometallurgy relates to the practice of combining geology or geostatistics  with metallurgy, or, more specifically, extractive metallurgy, to create a spatially  or geologically based predictive model for mineral processing plants.  It is used in the hard rock mining industry for risk management and mitigation during mineral processing plant design.  It is also used, to a lesser extent, for production planning in more variable ore deposits.

There are four important components or steps to developing a geometallurgical program,:

the geologically informed selection of a number of ore samples
laboratory-scale test work to determine the ore's response to mineral processing unit operations
the distribution of these parameters throughout the orebody using an accepted geostatistical technique
the application of a mining sequence plan and mineral processing models to generate a prediction of the process plant behavior

Sample selection

The sample mass and size distribution requirements are dictated by the kind of mathematical model that will be used to simulate the process plant, and the test work required to provide the appropriate model parameters.  Flotation testing usually requires several kg of sample and grinding/hardness testing can required between 2 and 300 kg.

The sample selection procedure is performed to optimize granularity, sample support, and cost.  Samples are usually core samples composited over the height of the mining bench.  For hardness parameters, the variogram often increases rapidly near the origin and can reach the sill at distances significantly smaller than the typical drill hole collar spacing.  For this reason the incremental model precision due to additional test work is often simply a consequence of the central limit theorem, and secondary correlations are sought to increase the precision without incurring additional sampling and testing costs.  These secondary correlations can involve multi-variable regression analysis with other, non-metallurgical, ore parameters and/or domaining by rock type, lithology, alteration, mineralogy, or structural domains.

Test work

The following tests are commonly used for geometallurgical modeling:
 Bond ball mill work index test
 Modified or comparative Bond ball mill index
 Bond rod mill work index and Bond low energy impact crushing work index 
 SAGDesign test 
 SMC test
 JK drop-weight test
 Point load index test
 Sag Power Index test (SPI(R)) 
 MFT test 
 FKT, SKT, and SKT-WS tests

Geostatistics

Block kriging is the most common geostatistical method used for interpolating metallurgical index parameters and it is often applied on a domain basis.   Classical geostatistics require that the estimation variable be additive, and there is currently some debate on the additive nature of the metallurgical index parameters measured by the above tests. The Bond ball mill work index test is thought to be additive because of its units of energy;  nevertheless, experimental blending results show a non-additive behavior.  The SPI(R) value is known not to be an additive parameter, however errors introduced by block kriging are not thought to be significant .  These issues, among others, are being investigated as part of the Amira P843 research program on Geometallurgical mapping and mine modelling.

Mine plan and process models

The following process models are commonly applied to geometallurgy:
 The Bond equation
 The SPI calibration equation, CEET 
 FLEET*
 SMC model
 Aminpro-Grind, Aminpro-Flot models

See also
Extractive metallurgy
Geostatistics
Mining
Mineral Processing

Notes

General references
Isaaks, Edward H., and Srivastava, R. Mohan. An Introduction to Applied Geostatistics.  Oxford University Press, Oxford, NY, USA, 1989.
David, M., Handbook of Applied Advanced Geostatistical Ore Reserve Estimation.  Elsevier, Amsterdam, 1988.
Mineral Processing Plant Design, Practice, and Control - Proceedings.  Ed. Mular, A., Halbe, D., and Barratt, D.  Society for Mining, Metallurgy, and Exploration, Inc. 2002.
Mineral Comminution Circuits - Their Operation and Optimisation.  Ed. Napier-Munn, T.J., Morrell, S., Morrison, R.D., and Kojovic, T.  JKMRC, The University of Queensland, 1996

Economic geology
Metallurgy
Mining
Materials science